Revaz Chelebadze (born 2 October 1955) was a retired Georgian football player. He was nicknamed Chele (an allusion to Pelé), for his brilliant technical play and ability to score goals. The stadium in his hometown of Kobuleti is named Chele Arena.

Honours
 Soviet Top League winner: 1978.
 Soviet Cup winner: 1976, 1979.
 Olympic bronze: 1980.

International career
Chelebadze made his debut for USSR on 7 September 1977 in a friendly against Poland.

External links
  Profile

1955 births
Living people
People from Kobuleti
Footballers from Georgia (country)
Soviet footballers
Soviet Union international footballers
FC Dinamo Tbilisi players
FC Guria Lanchkhuti players
Olympic footballers of the Soviet Union
Olympic bronze medalists for the Soviet Union
Footballers at the 1980 Summer Olympics
FC Dinamo Batumi players
Soviet Top League players
Medalists at the 1980 Summer Olympics
Association football forwards